Pseudoalteromonas tetraodonis is a marine bacterium isolated from the surface slime of the puffer fish. It secretes the neurotoxin, tetrodotoxin. It was originally described in 1990 as Alteromonas tetraodonis but was reclassified in 2001 to the genus Pseudoalteromonas.

References

External links
Type strain of Pseudoalteromonas tetraodonis at BacDive -  the Bacterial Diversity Metadatabase

Alteromonadales
Bacteria described in 1990